Morris County is a county located in the U.S. state of New Jersey, about  west of New York City. According to the 2020 census, the county was the state's tenth-most populous county, with a population of 509,285, its highest decennial count ever and an increase of 17,009 (3.5%) from the 492,276 counted at the 2010 census. Morris County is part of the New York metropolitan area and is divided into 39 municipalities, with many commuter towns but no large cities. Its county seat is Morristown, in the southeast. The most populous place was Parsippany-Troy Hills Township, with 56,162 residents at the time of the 2020 census, while Rockaway Township covered , the largest total area of any municipality.

In 2015, the county had a per capita personal income of $86,582, the highest in New Jersey and ranked 24th of 3,113 counties in the United States. Morris County, as of the 2000 Census, was the sixth-wealthiest county in the United States by median household income at $77,340 (second in New Jersey behind Hunterdon County at $79,888), sixth in median family income at $89,773 (third in New Jersey behind Hunterdon County at $91,050 and Somerset County at $90,605) and ranked tenth by per capita income at $36,964 (second in New Jersey behind Somerset County at $37,970).

The Bureau of Economic Analysis ranked the county as having the 16th-highest per capita income of all 3,113 counties in the United States (and the second highest in New Jersey) as of 2009. The county ranked third in the New York metropolitan area in terms of median income. Morris County was recently ranked number 2 of 21 NJ counties as one of the healthiest counties in New Jersey, according to an annual report by County Health Rankings and Roadmaps. The county is part of the North Jersey region.

History

Etymology
Morris County was named after Colonel Lewis Morris, governor of New Jersey in 1738-39, the year the county was named.

Paleo Indians and Native Americans
The Wisconsin Glacier covered the northern section of Morris County from about 23,000 B.C. to 13,000 B.C.

After the Wisconsin Glacier melted around 13,000 B.C., Paleo Indians moved into the area from the south in search of big and small game as well as plants. The area was first tundra with grasses growing.  Rabbits and fox moved into the area from the south.

Around the year 1000, the area of Morris County was inhabited by the Lenape Native Americans prior to the arrival of European settlers. They came from the Mississippi River area. They lived along the rivers and hunted game, fished, collected plants and nuts.

Dutch and English colonization 
Henry Hudson explored the Hudson River area in 1609, and later the Dutch did surveys of the area.

From 1611 to 1614, the Dutch established the colony of New Netherland, which claimed territory between the 40th and 45th parallel north, a zone which included northern New Jersey. Dutch forts were established along the Hudson River beginning in 1613.  As the years went by, more forts were established to trade with Native Americans.

The Native Americans traded furs and food with the Dutch for various goods. In return the Dutch gave the Native Americans metal pots, knives, guns, axes, and blankets.  Trading with the Native Americans occurred until 1643 when a series of wars broke out between the Dutch and Native Americans.

There were hostile relations between the Dutch and Native Americans between 1643 and 1660. This prevented colonization by the Dutch of the Morris County region which was technically included in their claimed "New Netherland".

On August 27, 1664, three English ships approached Fort Amsterdam and the fort was surrendered to the English. The English now controlled New Netherland and Morris County was now under control of the colony of New York. Relations with the Native Americans improved for a while.

There was a war with the Dutch ten years later. The Dutch re-took control of New Amsterdam but after a year returned it to the English. Relations with the Native Americans and English improved for a while.

European settlements began in the early 18th century while the area was known as Hunterdon County. Native Americans were still in the area at that time. Land was purchased from the Native Americans for various things such as blankets, shirts, rum, guns, knives, pots and gunpowder.  European colonization occurred along the Atlantic coast and moved inland.

The first European settlement in the area today known as Morris County occurred in Pompton Plains by the Dutch in 1695. From 1710 to 1730, various iron mines and forges were established. The first was in Whippany in 1710 and then in Succasunna in 1713.

By 1750, nearly all Native Americans had left New Jersey. This was due to land purchases from the Native Americans, diseases that the Native Americans contracted from Europeans, and due to starvation from the Little Ice Age, during which Native American corn crops failed and rivers froze, preventing fishing. Snow storms sent game into semi-hibernation or made them difficult to find. Nut crops such as oak, hickory, beech, walnut, chestnut and butternut failed some years due to late frosts in spring. Many of the Morris County Native Americans went to eastern Canada and others went to the Ohio Valley. The Walking Purchase in September 1737, prevented Native Americans from going to eastern Pennsylvania. At that time, European settlement grew swiftly as there was now land to be farmed and settled.

Morris County was originally part of Burlington County which had been established in 1694. It then became part of Hunterdon County, which separated from Burlington County in 1714.

Morris County was created on March 15, 1739, from portions of Hunterdon County. The county was named for the Governor of the Province of New Jersey, Colonel Lewis Morris. In later years Sussex County (on June 8, 1753) and, after the revolution, Warren County (on November 20, 1824, from portions of Sussex County) were carved out of what had been the original area of Morris County under English rule.

The county was the site of the winter camp of the Continental Army after the Battles of Trenton and Princeton during the winter of 1777, as well as another winter camp at Jockey Hollow during an extremely cold winter of 1779–80.

In the 1880s, Dover was the center of iron ore mining with the 132 mines producing 700,000 tons of ore annually. The mines were mostly worked by Cornish miners, with the bulk of the population in Dover and Port Oram of Cornish extraction. At that time the Cornish had kept their customs and dialect, were deeply religious and predominantly Methodists.

Geography and geology

The county rises in elevation and relief from east to west, with only the more developed eastern suburbs in the Passaic River valley being relatively level.

The county is drained by several rivers. The Rockaway River drains , of the northern section of the county. The Whippany River drains  of the middle of the county. The South Branch of the Raritan River and the Black River drain the western area.

Most of the county's borders are rivers. The Pequannock River drains the northern boundary area. The Pompton River drains the eastern section. The Passaic River also drains the eastern border area. The western border is drained by the Musconetcong River. There are several large lakes in Morris County; among them are Lake Hopatcong, Budd Lake, Lake Parsippany, and the Boonton Reservoir, also known as the Jersey City Reservoir.

Climate
Morris has a humid continental climate (Dfa/Dfb) and the hardiness zones are 6a and 6b.

Weather

Geology

Around 500 million years ago, a chain of volcanic islands shaped like an arc collided with proto-North America. The islands rode over top of the North American plate. This created the highlands in western Morris County and the eastern section of Morris County.

Around 400 million years ago, a small continent long and narrow collided with proto-North America. This created folding and faulting, as compression occurred. Then around 350 million years ago, the African plate collided with North America creating the folding and faulting in the Appalachians. But when the African plate pulled away from North America, an aborted rift valley was created. This half graben, starts east of Boonton and goes through the middle of Parsippany, south to Morristown, to the south end of Great Swamp. From Parsippany and the Boonton area the half graben goes east to the western side of Paterson, where there was another fault by the lava flows. East of the Ramapo Fault is where there is this aborted rift valley.

The Ramapo fault goes through the county on a northeast-southwest axis. The fault separates the Highlands from the Piedmont, also known as the Newark Basin. This is an active fault. The last major earthquake occurred in 1884, with a strength measured at 5.3 on the Richter scale.

Around 21,000 BCE., the Wisconsin Glacier covered about half of Morris County. The terminal moraine went from Hackettstown east to north of Budd Lake, east to Rockaway and Denville, then southeast to Morristown then south to the south end of Great Swamp. When the glacier melted around 13,000 B.C. the melt water created Glacial Lake Passaic. The lake extended from what is now Pompton Lakes through Parsippany south to the south end of Great Swamp. From Parsippany the lake went east to the lava flows of western Paterson. Due to debris from the glacier, the lake was unable to drain through the Watchung Mountains near Short Hills. Instead, it drained through Moggy Hollow at the southwestern end of the lake. But when the glacier melted and receded to the New York State line, the lake drained though the Little Falls area, as this was lower in elevation than Moggy Hollow. And thus the Passaic River formed.

The swamps of the Great Piece Meadows, Hatfield Swamp, Troy Meadows, Lee Meadows and Great Swamp were all under the Lake Passaic until it drained, and then these areas were created.

Demographics

2020 census 
As of the 2020 census, the county had 509,285 people, 184,885 households, and 129,707 families. The county's racial makeup was 67.0% White, 3.06% African American, 0.07% Native American, 11.3% Asian, and 3.0% from two or more races. Hispanic or Latino of any race accounted for 15.05% of the population.

Of the 184,885 households, of which 38.8% had children under the age of 18 living with them, 59.3% were married couples living together, 22.7% had a female householder with no husband present, 13.5% had a male householder with no wife present and 29.8% were non-families. 28.4% of all households were made up of individuals, and 11.9% had someone living alone who was 65 years of age or older. The average household size was 2.61 and the average family size was 3.17. 

About 21.4% of the county's population was under age 18, 8.5% was from age 18 to 24, 35.9% was from age 15 to 44, and 17.5% was age 65 or older. The median age was 43.3 years. The gender makeup of the city was 49.2% male and 50.8% female. For every 100 females, there were 96.9 males. The city's median household income was $116,283, and the median family income was $141,633. About 5.5% of the population were below the poverty line, including 5.1% of those under age 18 and 5.6% of those age 65 or over.

2010 Census

Government

County government

Morris County is governed by a Board of County Commissioners comprised of seven members who are elected at-large in partisan elections to three-year terms on a staggered basis, with either one or three seats up for election each year as part of the November general election. Actual day-to-day operation of departments is supervised by Acting County Administrator Deena Leary, who was designated to fill the position following the retirement of John Bonanni at the end of 2022. In 2016, freeholders were paid $24,375 and the freeholder director was paid an annual salary of $25,350. 

, Morris County's Commissioners are
Commissioner Director John Krickus (R, Washington Township, term as commissioner ends December 31, 2024; term as director ends 2023)
Commissioner Deputy Director Christine Myers (R, Mendham Township, term as commissioner ends 2025; term as deputy director ends 2023), 
Douglas Cabana (R, Boonton Township, 2025), 
Thomas J. Mastrangelo (R, Montville, 2025),
Tayfun Selen (R, Chatham Township),
Stephen H. Shaw (R, Mountain Lakes, 2024) and
Deborah Smith (R, Denville, 2024).

Former commissioners
Former county commissioners include:
 2018–2020: Heather Darling (R)
 2013–2019: John Cesaro (R)
 2012–2018: Hank Lyon (R)
 2013–2015: David Scapicchio (R)
 2007–2012: Eugene Feyl (R)
 1999–2012: Margaret Nordstrom (R)
 2006–2012: William Chegwidden (R)
 1998–2012: John Murphy (R)
 1999–2010: Jack Schrier (R)
 2007–2010: James Murray (R)
 2001–2007: John Inglesino (R)
 1992–2006: Cecilia Laureys (R)
 1984, 1992–2006: Frank Dreutzler (R)
 1995–1997: Chris Christie (R)
 1975–1978: Douglas Romaine (D)

Constitutional officers
Pursuant to Article VII Section II of the New Jersey State Constitution, each county in New Jersey is required to have three elected administrative officials known as constitutional officers. These officers are the County Clerk and County Surrogate (both elected for five-year terms of office) and the County Sheriff (elected for a three-year term). , they are 
County Clerk Ann F. Grossi (R, Parsippany–Troy Hills, 2023),
Sheriff James M. Gannon (R, Boonton Township, 2022) and
Surrogate Heather Darling (R, Roxbury, 2024).

The County Prosecutor is Robert J. Carroll of Roseland, who was sworn into the position in October 2020 following the retirement of Frederic M. Knapp. Morris County is a part of Vicinage 10 of the New Jersey Superior Court (along with Sussex County), which is seated at the Morris County Courthouse in Morristown; the Assignment Judge for Vicinage 10 is Stuart A. Minkowitz. Law enforcement at the county level is the Morris County Sheriff's Office. The Morris County Park Police was disbanded and merged with the Sheriff's Office on January 1, 2022. The County law enforcement organization includes the Morris County Prosecutor's Office.

Federal representatives 
The 7th and 11th Congressional Districts cover the county.

State representatives 
The 39 municipalities of Morris County are represented by six separate legislative districts.

Politics 
Though New Jersey is mainly a Democratic state, Morris County has generally leaned towards the Republican Party. The GOP has carried the county in all but three presidential elections since 1896: in 1912, 1964, and 2020. Republicans hold every countywide elected office and the majority of the county's seats in the state legislature. The last Democrat to win a county office was Commissioner Douglas Romaine in 1973. As of October 1, 2021, there were a total of 397,571 registered voters in Morris County, of whom 136,127 (34.2%) were registered as Republicans, 117,323 (29.5%) were registered as Democrats and 140,145 (35.3%) were registered as unaffiliated. There were 3,976 voters (1.0%) registered to other parties.

In the 2008 election, Democrat Barack Obama came within 9 points of winning the county. In the 2012 election, Democrat Barack Obama lost the county by 10.8%. In 2016, Hillary Clinton came closer than any Democrat to carry the county since Lyndon Johnson's win in 1964, finishing just 4.2 percent behind Donald Trump despite the rightward shift in the nation in this election. In 2020, Joe Biden accomplished that feat, carrying Morris County by 4.2 percent, and at the same time, Cory Booker became the first Democrat to win Morris County in a Senate election since Bill Bradley in 1984.

|}

In the 2009 gubernatorial election, Republican Chris Christie received 60.0% of the vote (99,085 votes) to Democratic Governor Jon Corzine's 31.26% (51,586 votes), while Independent Chris Daggett received 8.1% of the vote (13,321). In the 2013 gubernatorial election, Republican Chris Christie received 70% of the vote here (98,888 ballots cast), ahead of Democrat Barbara Buono with 28.2% (39,824 votes), and other candidates with 1.8% (2,560 votes), among the 143,745 ballots cast by the county's 324,817 registered voters, yielding a 44.25% turnout. In the 2017 gubernatorial election, Republican Kim Guadagno received 53.08% of the vote (77,203 ballots cast), ahead of Democrat Phil Murphy with 45.04% (65,507 votes), and other candidates with 1.88% (2,742 votes). In the 2021 gubernatorial election, Republican Jack Ciattarelli received 55.25% of the vote (102,769 ballots cast), ahead of Democrat Phil Murphy with 44.04% (81,915 votes).

Municipalities 

The 39 municipalities in Morris County (with 2010 Census data for population, housing units and area) are:

Economy

Morris County has the third-highest median household income in the United States ($77,340).

Based on data from the Bureau of Economic Analysis, Morris County had a gross domestic product (GDP) of $52.5 billion in 2018, which was ranked 3rd in the state behind Bergen and Middlesex counties and represented an increase of 1.7% from the previous year.

Taxation
Based on IRS data for the 2004 tax year, Morris County had the tenth-highest average federal income tax liability per return in the country. Average tax liability was $15,296, representing 16.3% of adjusted gross income. Mountain Lakes ranked among the highest annual property tax bills in New Jersey, and highest in Morris County, in 2018 of $20,471, compared to a statewide average of $8,767.

Business

Morris County is home to 33 Fortune 500 businesses that have headquarters, offices or a major facility in Morris County. These include AT&T, Honeywell, Colgate-Palmolive, Pfizer, Johnson & Johnson, ExxonMobil, Novartis, BASF, Verizon, and Bayer, among others. Major industries include finance, insurance, real estate, pharmaceuticals, health services, research and development, and technology. There are  set aside for 28 county parks. Four county golf courses and 16 public and private courses are in Morris.

Major employers in the county include:

Housing expense

By national standards, housing is expensive in Morris County. In 2018, the median house price in Morris County was $469,900, the 2nd highest in the state behind Bergen County (with a median home price of $476,200).

In the Forbes magazine 2012 ranking of the Most Expensive ZIP Codes in the United States, New Vernon (located within Harding Township) was ranked as the 32nd most expensive in the country, with a median home sale price of $2,701,885. There were a total of 6 Morris county zip codes listed in the top 500, which were Mountain Lakes (No. 288; $909,474), Mendham (includes both Mendham Borough and Mendham Township) (No. 356; $800,672), Chatham (includes both Chatham Borough and Chatham Township) (No. 375; $776,703), Florham Park (No. 440; $675,107), and Kinnelon (No. 462; $630,414).

In the magazine's 2006 listing, New Vernon (Harding Township) was ranked as the 23rd most expensive in the country, with its median home sale price in 2005 of $1,596,587 ranking as the state's 2nd highest behind Alpine located Bergen County. In all, 5 Morris County zip codes were represented on the list in addition to New Vernon, including Mendham (includes both Mendham Borough and Mendham Township) (ranked No. 209; median sale price of $835,000), Mountain Lakes (No. 217; $826,250), Green Village (located within portions of both Harding Township and Chatham Township) (No. 282; $777,465), and Chester (includes both Chester Borough and Chester Township) (No. 288; $775,000).

Education

As of 2018, 56.1 percent of Morris County residents were college graduates, the 2nd highest percentage in the state behind neighboring Somerset County with 58.0 percent.

 The County College of Morris is a two-year public community college serving students from Morris County, with its main campus in Randolph and was founded in 1965.
 The Assumption College for Sisters is another two-year college, the private Roman Catholic women's college located in Mendham.

The Florham Park–Madison–Convent Station (Morris Township) area is also the home of three universities.

 The Florham Campus of Fairleigh Dickinson University, is located on the border of these three municipalities.
 Drew University is a small, private university in Madison.
 The College of Saint Elizabeth is a private Roman Catholic, four-year, liberal arts college located in Convent Station that has been coeducational starting in September 2016, after being women-only since it opened in 1899.

The Morris Automated Information Network, which supplies Internet service to area libraries, turned down $10,000 per year in federal funding, starting in 2004. Acceptance of the grants would have required the network to install anti-porn content filters to comply with the Children's Internet Protection Act. As these filters excluded legitimate information—such as pages with the word "breast" in online searches regarding "breast cancer"—the network declined to accept these grants. Another organization having the power to affect the county budget without county governmental control is the Morris County Board of Taxation, (also called the Morris County Tax Board). "[T]he freeholders, and county government in general, do not have control over tax board spending. ... [T]he tax board is an entity of state government, even though it submits expense vouchers to county government."

Arts and culture

 Mayo Performing Arts Center (MPAC) is a former Walter Reade movie theater originally constructed in 1937 that has been converted into a 1,302-seat performing arts center.
 Morris Museum – formally incorporated in 1943. The museum's permanent displays include rocks, minerals, fossils, animal mounts, a model railroad, and Native American crafts, pottery, carving, basketry and textiles.
 Morristown National Historical Park — Four historic sites around Morristown associated with the American Revolutionary War, including Jockey Hollow, a park that includes a visitor center, the Revolution-era Wick farm, encampment site of George Washington's Continental Army, and around 25 miles of hiking trails, and the Washington's Headquarters & Ford Mansion, a Revolution-era Georgian-style mansion used by George Washington as his headquarters during the Jockey Hollow encampment.
 Morristown Green – Park at the center of town which was the old town "common" or "green". It is the site of several Revolutionary War and Civil war monuments, and is surrounded by historic churches, the colonial county-courthouse, and a shopping and restaurant district.
 St. Peter's Episcopal Church — Large McKim Mead and White church with bell tower, fine stained glass and medieval furnishings.
 Acorn Hall – 1853 Victorian Italianate mansion and home to the Morris County Historical Society. Donated to the historical society in 1971 by actress and political activist Mary Crane Hone, the mansion retained much of its original furnishings and accouterments as it remained in the same family for over a century. It is currently operated as a museum and is the headquarters of the Morris County Historical Society.
 Speedwell Ironworks is a National Historic Landmark and museum at the site where the electric telegraph was first presented to the public, on January 11, 1838.
 Shakespeare Theatre of New Jersey, located in Madison is one of 25 professional theatres in the state. Serving 100,000 adults and children annually, it is New Jersey's only professional theatre company dedicated to Shakespeare's canon and other classic masterworks. The F.M. Kirby Shakespeare Theatre, the company's main stage, is a short walk from Madison's downtown shopping district.

Sports

The United States Equestrian Team, the international equestrian team for the United States, was founded in 1950 at the Coates estate on van Beuren Road in Morristown.

Morristown has a cricketing club, the first in North America.

The Mennen Arena in Morris Township, facilitated by The Morris County Park Commission, hosts various sporting events from ice hockey, figure skating, indoor football and outdoor rugby, to professional wrestling, MMA and Shrine Circus.

Points of interest
The County boasts 13,000 acres that encompass 28 parks making it the largest county park system in New Jersey based on acreage. Notably, Morristown National Historical Park became the country's first National Historical Park in 1933.

National protected areas
 Great Swamp National Wildlife Refuge (part)
 Morristown National Historical Park
 Troy Meadows

Other points of interest
 Morris County Golf Club, founded in 1894, was unique at the time in that it was established and operated by women. Two of the club's presidents have served as United States Golf Association presidents, which the club joined in 1895. The current course was designed in 1916 by architect Seth Raynor. The current clubhouse was built in 1919.

Transportation

Roads and highways

Morris County is served by several major roadways including:
 Interstate 80
 Interstate 280
 Interstate 287
 U.S. Route 46
 U.S. Route 202
 U.S. Route 206
 Route 10
 Route 15
 Route 23
 Route 181 (Only in Jefferson Township)
 Route 24
 Route 124
 County Route 513
 County Route 517 (Only in Washington Township)
 County Route 510

Public transportation

NJ Transit also provides rail service with Morris County via its Morris & Essex Lines and Montclair-Boonton Line to Hoboken Terminal and to New York City via its Midtown Direct service.  Rail stations are located in the county providing electrified train service seven days a week from: Chatham, Madison, Convent Station, Morristown, Morris Plains, Denville, and Dover on NJ Transit's Morris & Essex Lines; electrified train service seven days a week from Gillette, Millington and Stirling on the Gladstone Branch; and diesel train service (weekdays only) from Mount Arlington, Lake Hopatcong, Netcong, Mount Olive, Mountain Lakes, Boonton, Towaco (Montville) and Lincoln Park.

Bus transportation is also offered by several carriers including Lakeland Bus Company and NJ Transit.

Air
Operated by DM Airports, Ltd, it is in the Whippany section of Hanover Township.

Local media
WMTR is an AM radio station at 1250 kHz is licensed to Morristown and features an oldies format.
WDHA is an FM radio station (105.5 FM) broadcasting from Dover with their main studios in Cedar Knolls, featuring a rock format.
WJSV radio and television (90.5 FM) is also in Morristown, the non-profit radio station of Morristown High School, which also has a television show which is shown on cable television, Colonial Corner.
The Morristown Daily Record and The Star-Ledger and New Jersey Hills Media are published locally.
Hometown Tales, a Public-access television cable TV show and podcast chronicling stories and urban legends from around the world, is loosely based in Morristown.

See also

Fire departments of Morris County, New Jersey
National Register of Historic Places listings in Morris County, New Jersey
Sheep Hill Observatory
Whippany River Watershed Action Committee

References

External links

Official website

 
1739 establishments in New Jersey
Counties in the New York metropolitan area
North Jersey
Populated places established in 1739